Euridice was a torpedo cruiser of the  built for the Italian Regia Marina (Royal Navy) in the 1880s. She was built by the Regio Cantiere di Castellammare di Stabia shipyard, with her keel laying in February 1889, her launching in September 1890, and her commissioning in May 1891. Her main armament were her six torpedo tubes, which were supported by a battery of ten small-caliber guns. Euridice spent most of her career in the main Italian fleet, where she was primarily occupied with training exercises. She was withdrawn from service in 1907 and sold for scrapping.

Design

The Partenope-class cruisers were derivatives of the earlier, experimental s, themselves based on the preceding cruiser . The doctrine emphasized the use of small, torpedo-armed craft to destroy expensive ironclads.

She displaced  normally. The ship had a short forecastle deck that terminated at the conning tower. She had a crew of between 96 and 121 personnel.

Her propulsion system consisted of a pair of horizontal triple-expansion steam engines, each driving a single screw propeller. Steam was supplied by four coal-fired locomotive boilers, which were vented through two widely spaced funnels.

Euridice was armed with a main battery of one  /40 gun placed on the forecastle. Close-range defense against torpedo boats was provided by a secondary battery of six  /43 guns mounted singly. She was also equipped with three  /20 guns in single mounts. Her primary offensive weapon was her six  torpedo tubes.

Service history
The keel for Euridice was laid down on 14 February 1889 at the Regio Cantiere di Castellammare di Stabia (Royal Dockyard in Castellammare di Stabia). The completed hull was launched on 22 September 1890. After fitting-out work was completed, the ship was commissioned into the fleet on 1 May 1891. During the maneuvers, which lasted from 6 August to 5 September, the ships of the Active Squadron simulated a French attack on the Italian fleet. Beginning on 14 October 1894, the Italian fleet, including Euridice, assembled in Genoa for a naval review held in honor of King Umberto I at the commissioning of the new ironclad . The festivities lasted three days.

In 1895, she was assigned to the 2nd Division of the Permanent Squadron, which included her sister ship , the ironclad battleship , and the protected cruiser . The Squadron was based at La Spezia at the time, though Euridice was stationed primarily in Taranto and Naples, along with most of the other torpedo cruisers of the Italian fleet.

In February 1897, Euridice deployed to Crete to serve in the International Squadron, a multinational force made up of ships of the Austro-Hungarian Navy, French Navy, Imperial German Navy, Regia Marina, Imperial Russian Navy, and British Royal Navy that intervened in the 1897–1898 Greek uprising on Crete against rule by the Ottoman Empire. She arrived as part of an Italian division that also included the battleships Sicilia (flagship of the division's commander, Vice Admiral Felice Napoleone Canevaro) and Re Umberto and the protected cruiser . At the time, she was assigned to the 1st Division, which included the three  ironclads, Vesuvio, and the protected cruiser .

Euridice served in the active squadron in 1902. In 1903, Euridice was assigned to the 1st Squadron, along with her sister . The unit also included eight battleships, six other cruisers, and six destroyers. The 1st Squadron was kept in active service for seven months of the year for training, and had reduced crews for the remainder of the year. The ship was sold for scrap in March 1907 and subsequently broken up.

Footnotes

Notes

Citations

References

External links
 Euridice Marina Militare website

1890 ships
Partenope-class cruisers
Ships built in Castellammare di Stabia